Datuk Samsolbari bin Jamali (born 1 July 1960) is a Malaysian politician who has served as Deputy Speaker of the Johor State Legislative Assembly since April 2022 and Member of Johor State Legislative Assembly (MLA) for Semarang since March 2004. He served as Member of the Johor State Executive Council (EXCO) in the BN state administration under former Menteri Besar Hasni Mohammad from March 2020 to March 2022. He is a member of the United Malays National Organisation (UMNO), a component party of the ruling BN coalition.

Election results

Honours

Honours of Malaysia
  :
  Officer of the Order of the Defender of the Realm (KMN) (2005)
  :
  Companion Class I of the Order of Malacca (DMSM) – Datuk (2006)
  :
  Recipient of the Sultan Ibrahim Medal (PIS)

References 

Living people
People from Johor
Malaysian people of Malay descent
Malaysian Muslims
United Malays National Organisation politicians
21st-century Malaysian politicians
Members of the Johor State Legislative Assembly
Johor state executive councillors
Officers of the Order of the Defender of the Realm
1960 births